Kathryn Elizabeth Granahan (December 7, 1894 – July 10, 1979) was an American politician. She served as a member of the U.S. House of Representatives from Pennsylvania and as the Treasurer of the United States, having been appointed by President John F. Kennedy. 

Granahan was a member of the Democratic Party and was the first woman to be elected to the United States Congress from Philadelphia.

Early life
Born Kathryn Elizabeth O'Hay in Easton, Pennsylvania, all four of her grandparents were Irish immigrants. She graduated from Mount St. Joseph Collegiate Institute (later Chestnut Hill College) in Philadelphia, Pennsylvania.  

She was supervisor of public assistance in the State Auditor General's Department, and liaison officer between that department and Department of Public Assistance, Commonwealth of Pennsylvania from 1940 to 1943.  She was also a member of national board, Woman's Medical College of Pennsylvania.  

She was a delegate to the 1960 Democratic National Convention.

Congress
Her husband, Rep. William T. Granahan served in Congress from 1945 to 1947 and from 1949 until his death in 1956. His death came shortly after the 1956 primary election and the Democratic Party in Philadelphia selected Kathryn to succeed her husband in both the special election and general election. She was simultaneously elected to serve out her husband's term in the 84th United States Congress and a term in the 85th United States Congress in her own right.

She served as chair of the House Subcommittee on Postal Operations, and worked with Postmaster General Arthur Summerfield to pass the Granahan bill "to seize and detain the mail of anyone suspected of trafficking in obscenity."

After the 1960 Census, the State was expected to lose three seats in redistricting. The Democratic Party leadership chose Granahan's seat as one of those to be eliminated. Rep. Bill Green secured her assurance not to run in the 1962 elections. In return, Green convinced President John F. Kennedy to appoint her as Treasurer of the United States.

She began her term as Treasurer on January 9, 1963 after her term in Congress ended. In 1965, Granahan suffered a blood clot after a fall and worked a reduced schedule afterwards. In 1966, an effort to declare her incompetent failed; however she resigned four months later.

Later life
Granahan made guest appearances in two popular TV game shows: What's My Line? on March 3, 1963, and To Tell the Truth in November 1963.

She died in Norristown, Pennsylvania in 1979.

See also
 Women in the United States House of Representatives

References

Sources
 
 Remarks by Joseph M. Hoeffel of Pennsylvania
 Kathryn E. Granahan at The Political Graveyard

1894 births
1979 deaths
American people of Irish descent
Easton Area High School alumni
Chestnut Hill College alumni
Politicians from Easton, Pennsylvania
Treasurers of the United States
Female members of the United States House of Representatives
Spouses of Pennsylvania politicians
Women in Pennsylvania politics
Democratic Party members of the United States House of Representatives from Pennsylvania
20th-century American politicians
20th-century American women politicians